Byaroza District is a raion of the Brest Region of Belarus. Its administrative center is Byaroza. The district is located in northwestern Polesia.

History
The district was formed in 1940 after the Soviet annexation of Western Belarus.

In 1958–1967 the Byaroza hydroelectric power station was built. The town of Byelaazyorsk was built for the power station workers in 1958.

There are two biological reserves in the district, near villages Sporava and Buslowka.

Demographics
At the time of the Belarus Census (2009), Byaroza District had a population of 66,988. Of these, 90.8% were of Belarusian, 5.7% Russian, 1.8% Ukrainian and 1.0% Polish ethnicity. 61.7% spoke Belarusian and 36.2% Russian as their native language.

Economics
There are industry enterprises in the raion producing agricultural products, ceramics, construction materials, textiles.

An important railway branch connecting Brest and Minsk goes through the Byaroza district. Its main railway stations are Byaroza-Kartuzskaya, Bronnaya Hara and Byelaazyorsk.

Places of interest
 Orthodox Charnyakawskaya church of St. Nicholas (1725)
 Carthusian monastery ruins, Byaroza
 Homestead of the Puslowski family in Pyeski, 19th century
 Roman Catholic Church of St. Virgin Mary, Sihnyevichy (1795)
 Chernoye Lake (tenth the largest lake in Belarus)

Notable people 

 Aleś Razanaŭ (1947, Sialiec - 2021),  Belarusian writer, poet and translator.

References

External links
 Byaroza raion administration official website

 
Districts of Brest Region